Philip E. Agre is an AI researcher and humanities professor, formerly a faculty member at the University of California, Los Angeles. He is known for his critiques of technology. He was successively the publisher of The Network Observer (TNO) and The Red Rock Eater News Service (RRE). TNO ran from January 1994 to July 1996. RRE, an influential mailing list he started in the mid-1990s, ran for around a decade. A mix of news, Internet policy and politics, RRE served as a model for many of today's political blogs and online newsletters.

Agre was reported missing on October 16, 2009. He was found on January 16, 2010, but never returned to public life.

Biography

Agre grew up in Maryland and attended college early. Agre and his collaborator David Chapman started their PhDs under the supervision of Michael Brady at the MIT AI Lab. Upon Brady's departure for Oxford, they switched to a then-recent arrival at the laboratory, Rodney Brooks. Brooks gave the two young scientists relatively free rein, but together the three were seen as early major researchers in Nouvelle AI, an approach to artificial intelligence emphasizing behavior as emerging in interaction with the environment rather than the entire codification of behavior. This is illustrated by Agre and Chapman's 1989 article, "What are plans for?" This work is considered seminal to reactive planning, though neither researcher approved of the term.  

Agre went on to receive his doctorate in Electrical Engineering and Computer Science from MIT in 1989. He went on to take up a position in the University of Chicago Department of Computer Science, later joining the School of Cognitive and Computing Sciences (now the School of Informatics) at the University of Sussex and finally the Department of Information Studies at the University of California, Los Angeles.

"Surveillance and Capture"
Agre's essay "Surveillance and Capture" deals with privacy and surveillance issues made possible by our constantly evolving technological age. Influential works preceding this essay include George Orwell's Nineteen Eighty-Four (1949), Hans Magnus Enzensberger's Constituents of a Theory of the Media (1970), and Michel Foucault's works surrounding the concept of panopticism.  Foucault argues that a constant exercise of such surveillance is not necessary, since its mere possibility induces self-restrained action among the inmates.

Criticism of conservatism 
Agre has argued that conservatism is "the domination of society by an aristocracy.", that it "is incompatible with democracy, prosperity, and civilization in general." and that "It is a destructive system of inequality and prejudice that is founded on deception and has no place in the modern world." He also argued that "most of the people who call themselves 'conservatives' have little notion of what conservatism even is."

Disappearance
On October 16, 2009, Agre's sister filed a missing persons report for Agre. She indicated that she had not seen him since the spring of 2008 and became concerned when she learned that he had abandoned his apartment and job sometime between December 2008 and May 2009. Agre was found by the LA County Sheriff's Department on January 16, 2010, and was deemed in good health and self-sufficient.

Publications

Books and chapters 

 
 
 
 
 

.

Selected academic works

Other articles in the media

References

External links
former Home Page for Agre at UCLA

Artificial intelligence researchers
American cognitive scientists
American computer scientists
Human–computer interaction researchers
Living people
UCLA Graduate School of Education and Information Studies faculty
Year of birth missing (living people)